Junki Sasaki (born 14 June 1991) is a retired Japanese kickboxer and boxer. As a professional kickboxer, he held the  Krush Bantamweight title between 2019 and 2020. 

Sasaki was ranked as a top ten flyweight (-56 kg) kickboxer by Combat Press from April 2021 until December 2022, and as a top ten super flyweight (-55 kg) kickboxer by Beyond Kick from October to December 2022.

Kickboxing career

Bantamweight career
Sasaki was scheduled to make his kickboxing against Yuta Hayashi at Krush 98. He won the fight by unanimous decision.

After a first-round TKO of Shuto Hagiwara at Krush 103, Sasaki was scheduled to fight Koki Tomimura for the Krush Bantamweight title at Krush 107. Sasaki beat Tomimura by unanimous decision.

Sasaki was scheduled to make his first title defense against Samvel Babayan at Krush 112. The fight was later cancelled, as Babayan was unable to fly to Japan due to restrictions imposed to combat the COVID-19 pandemic.

Super Bantamweight career
For his next fight, Sasaki moved up in weight to super bantamweight, and was scheduled to fight Ryuto at Krush 116. He won the fight by majority decision.

Sasaki was scheduled to make his K-1 debut against another undefeated kickboxer in Riamu at K-1 World GP 2020 Winter's Crucial Bout. He won the fight by unanimous decision.

Sasaki was scheduled to fight Rat EiwaSportsGym at a 56 kg catchweight bout. Sasaki won the fight by majority decision. During the post-fight conference, Sasaki stated he was considering retirement. K-1 later changed the majority decision win to a unanimous decision win for Sasaki.

Sasaki was scheduled to take part in the 2022 K-1 Super Bantamweight World Grand Prix, which was held at K-1 World GP 2022 Japan on February 27, 2022. He faced Sho Uchida in the tournament quarterfinals. The fight was ruled a majority decision draw after the first three rounds, with one judge scoring the fight 30–29 for Uchida, while the remaining two judges scored it an even 30–30 draw. Sasaki was awarded the unanimous decision after an extension round was fought. He announced his retirement from professional competition on December 20, 2022.

Championships and accomplishments
 2019 Krush Bantamweight (53 kg) Champion

Kickboxing record

|- style="background:#fbb"
| 2022-02-27|| Loss||align=left| Masashi Kumura  ||  K-1 World GP 2022 Japan, Super Bantamweight World GP Semi Finals || Tokyo, Japan || TKO (2 Knockdowns/Punches)  ||1  ||1:37  
|- style="background:#cfc"
| 2022-02-27|| Win ||align=left| Sho Uchida ||  K-1 World GP 2022 Japan, Super Bantamweight World GP Quarter Finals || Tokyo, Japan || Ext.R Decision (Unanimous) || 4||3:00 
|-  style="background:#cfc;"
| 2021-05-23|| Win || align=left| Rat EiwaSportsGym || K-1 World GP 2021: Japan Bantamweight Tournament || Tokyo, Japan || Decision (Unanimous)|| 3 || 3:00
|-  style="background:#cfc;"
| 2020-12-12 || Win || align=left| Riamu || K-1 World GP 2020 Winter's Crucial Bout || Tokyo, Japan || Decision (Unanimous) || 3 || 3:00
|-  style="background:#cfc;"
| 2020-08-29 || Win || align=left| Ryuto || Krush 116 || Tokyo, Japan || Decision (Majority) || 3 || 3:00
|-  style="background:#cfc;"
| 2019-11-08 || Win || align=left| Koki || Krush 107 || Tokyo, Japan || Decision (Unanimous) || 3 || 3:00
|-
! style=background:white colspan=9 |
|-  style="background:#cfc;"
| 2019-07-21 || Win || align=left| Shuto Hagiwara || Krush 103 || Tokyo, Japan || TKO (Three knockdowns) || 1 || 2:51
|-  style="background:#cfc;"
| 2019-02-16 || Win || align=left| Yuta Hayashi || Krush 98 || Tokyo, Japan || Decision (Unanimous) || 3 || 3:00
|-
|-
| colspan=9 | Legend:

Boxing record

See also
 List of male kickboxers

References

Living people
1991 births
Japanese male kickboxers
Japanese male boxers
Flyweight kickboxers
Sportspeople from Hokkaido